John Sokolowski (born 2 October 1975) is a retired Canadian bobsledder. He competed in the two man event at the 2002 Winter Olympics. He is the younger brother of fellow Olympian Michael Sokolowski.

References

External links
 

1975 births
Living people
Canadian male bobsledders
Olympic bobsledders of Canada
Bobsledders at the 2002 Winter Olympics
People from Miramichi, New Brunswick
Canadian people of Polish descent